Southgate Mall may refer to:

United States
Southgate Shopping Center in Southgate, Michigan
Westfield Southgate, formerly Southgate Plaza, in Sarasota, Florida
Southgate Mall (Elizabeth City) in Elizabeth City, North Carolina
Southgate Mall (Missoula) in Missoula, Montana
Southgate Mall (Muscle Shoals) in Muscle Shoals, Alabama

Canada
Southgate Centre in Edmonton, Alberta

South Africa
Southgate Shopping Centre in Johannesburg